Ashleigh Udalovas (born January 18, 1988) held the title of Miss New Jersey 2010 and competed in the Miss America 2011 Pageant on January 15, 2011, in Las Vegas, Nevada. She was the 1st runner-up at the Miss New Jersey 2009 pageant and competed in 2010 as Miss All-State. She also won the Interview award and Academic award at the 2010 pageant. Her talent is tap dancing. Her platform is "Read to Succeed: Improving America's Future Through Literacy. Udalovas has twice visited the Downe Township Elementary School in Newport, New Jersey to express the importance of literacy education to students.  She is the founder of the Cumberland County chapter of First Book, which is an organization that gives books to financially disadvantaged children, and the spokesperson for  Literacy Volunteers of New Jersey.

A graduate of Millville Senior High School, Udalovas attended Rowan University.

In November 2017, Udalovas was elected to the City of Millville's board of commissioners and was appointed to serve as director of public affairs.  She received 2,908 votes.

References

External links
 

1988 births
Living people
Millville Senior High School alumni
New Jersey city council members
People from Millville, New Jersey
Miss America 2011 delegates
Rowan University alumni
American beauty pageant winners
Women city councillors in New Jersey